The Centennial Tower, also known as Luneta Tower, was a proposed  mixed-use observation tower initially proposed to be located in Rizal Park, Manila, Philippines. It was later proposed to be built in Pasig amidst backlash over the original planned site. It was planned to be a memorial to the 100th anniversary of Philippine Independence.

Architecture and design
The Centennial Tower was designed by Filipino architect Francisco Mañosa. The proposed height was about 2 times higher than the Rufino Tower, the tallest building in Metro Manila as of 1996.

The structure designed by Mañosa was inspired from the sulo or bamboo torch to highlight the country's Asian heritage and character. The diameter of the tower's base was to measure . A  restaurant was to be hosted by tower at two-thirds up from its base. Government agencies and private firms were to occupy the tower for office use which includes at least 18 firms expressing interest to use the upper portion of the tower for telecommunications use. The building's design would later serve as the inspiration for the 2019 Southeast Asian Games cauldron

Planned construction
If the tower was constructed, the German firm was to operate the tower for 23 years after which it will transfer ownership and operations to the Philippine government. The Department of Transportation and Communications was the lead government agency for the construction project. In July 1996, Walter Bau-AG has expressed that it was capable to finish the construction of the building by 1998 but such plans were jeopardized due to the indecision of the administration of President Fidel V. Ramos to green light the construction of the tower.

Proposed location
The Centennial Tower was to be constructed in lieu of the skating rink at the center of the Agrifina Circle at Rizal Park due to its historical value, accessibility and aesthetic importance. The site was chosen over other six proposed sites – Corregidor,  Fort Bonifacio, Clark Freeport Zone, Cavite, Subic Bay Freeport Zone and Greenhills. The first site was found to be too inaccessible to the public, Fort Bonifacio and Cavite are within the air corridor of landing planes, Clark and Subic are surrounded by laharlands which the proponents of the project find unappealing for potential visitors of the tower and Greenhills was found to be overcrowded. Rizal Park was chosen due to its accessibility to tourists and the general public, the popular sunset at Manila Bay and the site's historical connections such as the execution of Jose Rizal which led to the Philippine Revolution.

In April 1996, the National Centennial Commission decided to move the site of the tower to a lot owned by the Metro Manila Development Authority in the corner of Julia Vargas and Meralco Avenues in Pasig from the original controversial site at the Agrifina Circle. However, the construction of the project never began.

Reception
The chosen site was a subject of criticism with critics saying the tower might "desecrate" the site. Senators Blas Ople and Ernesto Maceda has suggested the tower to be built at the Quezon Memorial Circle or Fort Bonifacio instead of Rizal Park, where the Rizal Monument might be dwarfed by the structure. Senator Gloria Macapagal Arroyo called for the scrapping of the project altogether saying while she supports effort to improve telecommunications in the country, she described the project as a "capricious" undertaking amidst the country's more urgent needs.

Mañosa answering to criticisms said that the tower will occupy the fourth quadrant facing Taft Avenue and it will be far enough from the Rizal Monument's quadrant. The architect remarked that the tower was "tall but not wide". He insists that the tower will boost the historic significance of Rizal Park and will encourage more tourists to visit the park. It was reported that the tower was to be constructed in an unstable base but Walter Bau-AG said it conducted soil analysis and guaranteed that the soil was stable and added that it had enough experience, resource and technology for the tower's construction.

See also
 Pagcor Tower
 Philippine Diamond Tower
 Torre de Manila

References

Unbuilt buildings and structures in the Philippines
Skyscrapers in Manila
Proposed buildings and structures in Metro Manila